Mukilan Pada was a Mughal warlord who attacked The Kingdom of Venad during the reign of Umayamma Rani (1677 - 1684). The invasion is presumed to have occurred during Malayalam Era 855 (AD 1680).

The Initial Invasion of Venad 
Mukilan invaded Venad through the southern borders and held Thiruvananthapuram. Umayamma of Venad, was then residing at Nedumangad Koikkal.

Destruction of Budhapuram Bhaktadasa Perumal Temple 
Neythasseri Potti, one of the custodians of Padmanabhaswamy Temple, had a Temple at Budhapuram in the Kanyakumari District. Koopakkara Potti, another custodian of the Padmanabhaswamy Temple, was the Thantri of Budhapuram Temple. The Presiding Deity of Budhapuram was Lord Bhaktadasa (Balarama) and another sanctum in the temple housed Lord Rukmininatha (Krishna as in the Thiruvambadi shrine of Padmanabhaswamy Temple). Neythasseri Potti had come to know about Mukilan's plan to attack the Temple and used his ties with Koopakkara Potti to shift the idols of Lord Balarama and Lord Rukmininatha to a nearby Swamiyar Madhom. After the attack initiated by Mukilan's forces on the Budhapuram Temple, the Shudras and Channars of the area had attempted to protect the temple against the raid by Mukilan, but he emerged victorious and plundered the Temple, slew cows within the Temple's premises, and razed it afterwards.

Locking up of Padmanabhaswamy Temple
As per Historian P. Sankunni Menon , the Yogathil Potties; the custodians of Padmanabhaswamy Temple, and the Ettuveettil Pillamar had locked up the Temple and fled on the grounds of caste pollution.

Defeat of Mukilan 
Umayamma Rani sought the assistance of Kerala Varma from northern Kottayam. Kerala Varma engaged Mukilan in battle at Thiruvattar as the major portion of the invading cavalry was dispersed from Varkala to Thovala to collect taxes. During the battle, according to local legends, Mukilan was attacked by a swarm of bees and he lost his mount. The fallen commander was slain with arrows and slingshots. Three hundred horses and many swords and spears were captured from the defeated army by Kerala Varma. The Rani adopted him to the Venad household as Iraniyal prince in official recognition of the help rendered. Following this, Kerala Varma became the primary advisor of the Rani.

Remnants 
Mukilan and his army are believed to have come through Ambasamudram and camped at Ottasekharamangalam Panchayat and Manacaud. Local traditions believe that the area had been named Mukilanthara which later became Pukilanthara. Further, it is a believed that the Kuthirakkuzhi (Horse-hole) in the Kalkulam Taluk, was where the cavalry of Mukilan was formerly stationed. The place Kanjikkuzhi  (Rice-gruel-hole) is believed to have been the place where his soldiers used to make rice gruel. Some legends state that Nanjukala was supposedly where Mukilan's army received its water supply, which had been laced with poison by the local population, and subsequently named after this event.

See also

 Battle of Manacaud
 Umayamma Rani

References 

History of Kerala
Mughal soldiers